Fourteen teams contested the 1999–2000 edition of the league. The first team in the league, Al Ahly, were crowned the champions, and qualified for the first round of the CAF Champions League in 2000 along with the team finishing in second place. Third placed team qualified to confederation cup. Finally, the last three in the league will play next season in the second division .

League table 

1999–2000 in African association football leagues
9
Premier